"Ship in a Bottle" is the 138th episode of the American science fiction television series Star Trek: The Next Generation, the 12th episode of the sixth season.

Set in the 24th century, the series follows the adventures of the Starfleet crew of the Federation starship Enterprise-D. In this episode, which continued a plot line from the second-season episode "Elementary, Dear Data", the fictional holodeck character Professor James Moriarty seizes control of the Enterprise in his quest to be freed to live in reality, outside the confines of a holographic environment.

Plot
Data and La Forge are enjoying a Sherlock Holmes holodeck program when the two notice that a character programmed to be left-handed was actually right-handed. They call Lt. Barclay to repair the holodeck, but as he checks the status of the Sherlock Holmes programs, he encounters an area of protected memory. He activates it to find the artificial sentient Professor James Moriarty (Daniel Davis) character projected into the Holodeck, who appears to have memory since his creation ("Elementary, Dear Data"), including during the period while he was inactive (a feat Picard claims to be impossible). Moriarty again wishes to escape the artificial world of the holodeck and was assured by the crew of the Enterprise that they would endeavor to find a way to do so, and is irritated at the lack of results on the part of the crew and their seeming lack of effort. Picard, along with Data and Barclay, attempts to assure Moriarty they are still working towards this goal but their technology does not yet permit it. Moriarty is dismissive.

Moriarty confuses the crew by seemingly willing himself to existence by walking out of the holodeck door. He explains this to the stunned Picard and Data by saying, "I think, therefore I am." Moriarty creates a companion for himself, the Countess Regina  Bartholomew (Stephanie Beacham), by commanding the computer of the Enterprise to place another sentient mind within a female character of the Sherlock Holmes novels. Moriarty then demands that a solution to get Regina off the holodeck be devised. He takes control of the Enterprise through the computer, insisting that a way be found for her to experience life beyond the confines of the holodeck.

While assisting La Forge, Data observes that La Forge's handedness is incorrect, just as they had experienced earlier. Data determines that he, Picard, and Barclay are still inside the holodeck with Moriarty and everyone else and everything that appears to be the Enterprise is part of a program Moriarty created. Picard then realizes that he has unwittingly provided Moriarty with the command codes for the Enterprise. With this information, Moriarty takes control of the real Enterprise from within the simulation.

Captain Picard finds a way to program the holodeck's simulation of a holodeck to convince Moriarty that he and Regina can be beamed into the real world, though in fact they are only "beamed" within the holodeck's simulation. Moriarty, satisfied with the ruse, releases control of the ship back to Picard. He and the Countess use a shuttlecraft given to them by Commander Riker to leave the Enterprise and explore the galaxy. Picard ends the simulation and the trio return to the real Enterprise. Barclay extracts the memory cube from the holodeck and sets it in an extended memory device in order to provide Moriarty and the Countess a lifetime of exploration and adventure.

Picard comments that the crew's reality may actually be a fabrication generated by "a little device sitting on someone's table." This unnerves Barclay enough for him to test the nature of his own reality one more time: he gives an audible command to "end program" to test whether he is still in a simulation. There is no response.

Academic study 
The book Hailing frequencies open: Communication in Star Trek: The Next Generation by Thomas D. Parham, III says that  "Ship in a Bottle" is an example of using interpersonal interactions to explore ontology. They found that several other episodes in the series used interpersonal interactions to explore philosophical concepts.

Reception
"Ship in a Bottle" was ranked the 21st of the 100 top episodes of all Star Trek by The Hollywood Reporter in 2016.
In 2011, this episode was noted by Forbes as one of the top ten episodes of the franchise that explores the implications of advanced technology. In 2016, TIME magazine ranked Moriarty as the 5th best villain character of the Star Trek franchise.

In 2009, Io9 Gizmodo listed "Ship in a Bottle" as one of the worst holodeck-themed episodes of Star Trek.

In 2012, Wired magazine said this one of the best episodes of Star Trek: The Next Generation.

In 2015, The Hollywood Reporter noted this episode's presentation of Moriarty setting out to explore the universe as one of the top ten "most stunning" moments of Star Trek: The Next Generation.

In 2019, CBR ranked it as the third best holodeck-themed episode of all Star Trek franchise episodes up to that time.

In 2020, ScreenRant ranked Moriarity the ninth best holodeck character of the Star Trek franchise.

Releases 
The episode was released as part of the Star Trek: The Next Generation season six DVD box set in the United States on December 3, 2002.  A remastered HD version was released on Blu-ray optical disc, on June 24, 2014.

See also
Brain in a vat
Projections (Star Trek: Voyager)
Simulated reality
Star Trek: Deep Space Nine debuted with "Emissary" on January 3, 1993 (in between TNG's "Chain of Command" (Part II) and this TNG episode)

References

External links

1993 American television episodes
Holography in television
Works based on Sherlock Holmes
Metafictional television episodes
Star Trek: The Next Generation (season 6) episodes